John Phelps may refer to:

Politics
John Phelps (regicide) (1619–?), Clerk of the High Court of England and Wales which tried Charles I of England for high treason in 1649
John M. Phelps (1821–1884), Republican President of the West Virginia Senate
John S. Phelps (1814–1886), Governor of Missouri (1876–1881)
John W. Phelps (1813–1885), American Civil War general and U.S. Presidential Candidate (1880)

Others
John E. Phelps (1839–1921), Union Army officer during the American Civil War
John Jay Phelps (1810–1869), American railroad baron and financier
John Phelps, writer for a number of British TV series including Birds of a Feather, My Hero and Young, Gifted and Broke

See also
Edward John Phelps (1822–1900), American lawyer and diplomat